Don Carlos Dunaway (fl. 1974–1993) is an American screenwriter known for his work on television programs of the 1970s. He wrote episodes for Baretta, The Rockford Files, and Star Trek: Deep Space Nine. In 1978 he co-created the TV series Kaz with Ron Leibman. In 1985 he directed an episode of The Twilight Zone. He lives in France with his wife who is a painter and with his cat Lou Lou. He has one son, one daughter, and six grandchildren. One of them is a young rapper named Pietro Dunaway, known as Er Danno 

Dunaway worked primarily in television, but also co-wrote the screenplays for Impulse and Cujo. He said that his primary contribution to the Cujo script was to remove the explicitly supernatural elements, because "if you have a perfectly set up rational explanation for the bad stuff... the supernatural stuff is redundant and distracting."

Filmography (selected)
 1974: Toma (2 episodes)
 1975–76: The Rockford Files (4 episodes)
 1978–79: Kaz (co-creator, wrote 23 episodes)
 1986: The Equalizer (creative consultant, 4 episodes)
 1976–77: Serpico (story consultant, 15 episodes)
 1978: The Paper Chase (story editor, 6 episodes)
 1993: Star Trek: Deep Space Nine (episode "The Forsaken")

References

External links

American screenwriters
Year of birth unknown
Year of death unknown